Baiyang may refer to:

Baiyang Lake, lake in Hebei, China
Baiyang River, river in Xinjiang, China
Baiyang, Zhijiang, in Zhijiang, Yichang, Hubei, China
Baiyang Subdistrict, in Wuxi County, Chongqing, China
Baiyang, Xinjiang, county-level city in Xinjiang, China